Franc Trkman (1903–1978) was an inventor and entrepreneur.

He was born in 1903 in Nanos – then in Austria-Hungary, now in Slovenia – and died in 1978 in Ljubljana. After attending primary school he continued his schooling in Ljubljana and became a carpentry foreman and, later, a mechanic. By the start of the Second World War he had founded his own workshop in Ljubljana, where he employed a few people until he became seriously ill in 1968.

In the former Yugoslavia and throughout Europe he was famous for a large number of patented inventions. Most of these he went on to manufacture and market himself, but where the market demanded greater quantities he sold or licensed the inventions (in the former communist Yugoslavia, legislation forbade the employment of more than seven people and production was limited to a small surface area.)

Altogether he patented 15 inventions in Yugoslavia and of these some also in Italy, Argentina and Germany. All these inventions were realised in practice and in their time were great hits. His watertight windows and framed balcony doors were installed throughout Yugoslavia in representative buildings and schools, and also in the Karadjordjevo palace of Marshal Tito in Serbia.

His invention of electrical switches for electrical hot plates was a hit immediately, and after the Second World War demand was so great he was forced to sell the license. The invention of accessories for vertically and horizontally opening windows was mass-produced at large companies due to the huge demand for them.
 
He also developed a special technological process for making high quality keys, which he kept to himself and used in his own workshop throughout his life.

The greatest international success he enjoyed was in 1934 in London, where at an international crafts fair his wedged window won a diploma, a gold medal and a silver cup.

In the former Yugoslavia he also won various awards and recognitions. He also won a prize in Czechoslovakia for solving a mathematical problem.

1903 births
1978 deaths
Slovenian inventors
People from the Municipality of Vipava
Yugoslav inventors